N'Ganon is a town in northern Ivory Coast. It is a sub-prefecture of Korhogo Department in Poro Region, Savanes District.

N'Ganon was a commune until March 2012, when it became one of 1126 communes nationwide that were abolished.

In 2014, the population of the sub-prefecture of N'Ganon was 5,386.

Villages
The 4 villages of the sub-prefecture of N'Ganon and their population in 2014 are:
 Katiaga (1 314)
 N'ganon (3 548)
 Sakouma (468)
 Sindjire (56)

Notes

Sub-prefectures of Poro Region
Former communes of Ivory Coast